Los Chiles is a district of the Los Chiles canton, in the Alajuela province of Costa Rica.

History
Los Chiles was originally settled by fishermen and others who worked on the nearby Río San Juan in Nicaragua. It was granted the title of "ciudad" (city) by a law of May 4, 1970.

During the 1980s, it was a strategic location on an important supply route for the Contras fighting to overthrow the Sandinista government in Nicaragua, and during that time military men from the United States were a common (albeit illegal) sight on the streets on the town.

Geography 
Los Chiles has an area of  km² and an elevation of  metres.

It is on the San Carlos Plain (Llanura de San Carlos) in northern Costa Rica, 14 kilometers southeast of San Carlos in Nicaragua, 97 kilometers northwest of Ciudad Quesada, 175 kilometers from the provincial capital city of Alajuela, and 198 kilometers from the national capital city of San Jose.

Demographics 

For the 2011 census, Los Chiles had a population of  inhabitants.

Transportation

Road transportation 
The district is covered by the following road routes:
 National Route 35
 National Route 138
 National Route 760

Airports 
Los Chiles is served by Los Chiles Airport, a grass runway on the east side of town.

Economy  
Los Chiles is a "border town," only four kilometers from Nicaragua. The vast majority of the population of the city was born in Nicaragua. The Río Frío, on the western edge of town, is a major thoroughfare used to access small villages and farms in the surrounding area.

The town is also an agriculture and sportfishing center. A gas station is located here, the only one for 20 kilometers in any direction, and a civil guard checkpoint is on Highway 35 south of town. There is a bank and a few basic restaurants and cabinas for lodging.

Tourism
 Caño Negro Wildlife Refuge: a watery lowland of lush sloughs and marshes, a seasonal lake, and abundant wildlife. Boats can be hired at Los Chiles for traveling the 23 kilometers down the Río Frío to Lake Caño Negro inside the reserve. The area is a birdwatcher's paradise. Tours to Caño Negro from La Fortuna and the Arenal Volcano area come by bus to Los Chiles, where visitors then board canopied boats for the trip down the Río Frío to the reserve. (29 kilometers southwest of Los Chiles via Highway 4 to El Parque, then west to San Emilio, and southwest on Highway 138 to Caño Negro)

 Solentiname Islands: an archipelago in Nicaragua lake. These islands are home to fishermen, farmers, and many painters and crafters. They are reached from Los Chiles by traveling up the Río Frío to the city of San Carlos in Nicaragua, from where boats journey into the lake to the islands.

Climate
This area  typically has a pronounced dry season.  According to the Köppen Climate Classification system, Los Chiles has a tropical savanna climate, abbreviated "Aw" on climate maps.

References 

Districts of Alajuela Province
Populated places in Alajuela Province